Barbara Gittings (July 31, 1932 – February 18, 2007) was a prominent American activist for LGBT equality. She organized the New York chapter of the Daughters of Bilitis (DOB) from 1958 to 1963, edited the national DOB magazine The Ladder from 1963 to 1966, and worked closely with Frank Kameny in the 1960s on the first picket lines that brought attention to the ban on employment of gay people by the largest employer in the US at that time: the United States government. Her early experiences with trying to learn more about lesbianism fueled her lifetime work with libraries. In the 1970s, Gittings was most involved in the American Library Association, especially its gay caucus, the first such in a professional organization, in order to promote positive literature about homosexuality in libraries. She was a part of the movement to get the American Psychiatric Association to drop homosexuality as a mental illness in 1972. Her self-described life mission was to tear away the "shroud of invisibility" related to homosexuality, which had theretofore been associated with crime and mental illness.

She was awarded a lifetime membership in the American Library Association, and the ALA named an annual award for the best gay or lesbian novel the Barbara Gittings Award. The Gay and Lesbian Alliance Against Defamation (GLAAD) also named an activist award for her. At her memorial service, Matt Foreman, the executive director of the National Gay and Lesbian Task Force said, "What do we owe Barbara? Everything."

Early life and education
Barbara Gittings was born to Elizabeth (née Brooks) Gittings and John Sterett Gittings in Vienna, Austria, where her father was serving as a U.S. diplomat. Barbara and her siblings attended Catholic schools in Montreal. She was so immersed in Catholicism at one point in her childhood that she considered becoming a nun. Her family returned to the United States at the outbreak of World War II and settled in Wilmington, Delaware. Although aware of her attraction to other girls, Gittings said she first heard the word "homosexual" when she was rejected for membership in the National Honor Society in high school. Despite being an excellent student, a teacher who had reservations about her character took her aside and told her that the rejection was based on what the teacher believed were "homosexual inclinations".

While majoring in drama at Northwestern University, Gittings developed a close but non-sexual friendship with another female student, prompting rumors that the two were lesbians, which led Gittings to examine her own sexual orientation. In her attempts to understand it, she had her suspicions confirmed by a psychiatrist who offered to cure her. Not having enough money to make regular visits, she was unable to get the money from her father, who reasoned there were no problems a psychiatrist could solve that a priest could not. A close friend suggested they see less of each other so as not to further encourage the rumors about them.

Having no one to talk to about the issues that were consuming her, she decided to read as much as she could on the topic. She found very little, and much of what she found described homosexuals as "deviants", "perverts", and "abnormal" in medical books and texts on abnormal psychology, or odd generalizations that stated homosexuals were unable to whistle, or that their favorite color was green. She found all the information focused on homosexual men.  She recalled in a 2001 interview, "I thought, this is not about me. There is nothing here about love or happiness. There has to be something better". Her research took up so much of her time at Northwestern that she ended up failing out of the school. Gittings found a purpose during this time, saying, "My mission was not to get a general education but to find out about myself and what my life would be like. So I stopped going to classes and started going to the library. There were no organizations to turn to in those days only libraries were safe, although the information contained was dismal."

After college
At age 17, she returned from Northwestern "in disgrace" after failing out of school and unable to tell her family why. But she was compelled to continue her search for information. She found some in the novels available at the time: Nightwood, The Well of Loneliness, and Extraordinary Women. Soon thereafter, her father discovered The Well of Loneliness in a pile of other things in her bedroom. He was so appalled at what he found that he instructed her to burn the book, but did so in a letter as he was unable to speak to her about it face to face. Still eager to learn more about homosexuality, Gittings took a night course in abnormal psychology where she met a woman, with whom she had a brief affair, her first. At age 18, she left home to be on her own and moved to Philadelphia.

Gittings began to hitchhike on weekends to New York City, dressed as a man, to visit gay bars since she knew of none in Philadelphia, and knew of no other places to go to get "plugged into the gay community." In a 1975 interview, she recalled, "I wore drag because I thought that was a way to show I was gay. It's changed now, but in the early 50s there were basically two types of women in the gay bars: the so-called butch ones in short hair and plain masculine attire and the so-called femme ones in dresses and high heels and makeup. I knew high heels and makeup weren't my personal style, so I thought...I must be the other kind!" However, Gittings found very little in common with the women she met in the bars, and after witnessing a gay male acquaintance get beaten up after leaving a bar, began to focus her energies on collecting books.

Activism in the 1950s and 1960s

Daughters of Bilitis
In 1956, Gittings traveled to California on the advice of Donald Webster Cory, to visit the office of the new ONE, Inc., an early homophile organization that dedicated itself to providing support to homosexuals in the US. While in California, she met Phyllis Lyon and Del Martin, who had co-founded the Daughters of Bilitis (DOB) in San Francisco. "She was a cute, curly-haired young woman wearing a shift and sandals. I remember she had this satchel, a backpack — I'd never seen anything like it. Or her", Lyon remembered. At her first meeting of the Daughters of Bilitis in someone's living room, Gittings brought up the obscurity of the name, which she thought was impractical, difficult to pronounce and spell, and referenced a fictional bisexual character, not even homosexual. "Even then I was pretty assertive...What were they doing with a name like that? It wasn't very nice of me, but they seemed to take it with reasonably good spirits."

In 1958, Martin and Lyon asked Gittings to start a chapter in New York City, which she did when less than a dozen women responded to her notice in the Mattachine Society newsletter asking for "all women in the New York area who are interested in forming a chapter of the DOB" on September 20, 1958. Gittings served as the chapter's first president for three years, from 1958 until 1961, the year she met Kay Tobin.

In 1982, Gittings remembered, "I joined the movement in 1958, when the subject of homosexuality was still shrouded in complete silence. There were no radio talk shows or TV documentaries. In all the United States, there were maybe a half dozen groups, two hundred people active in all." The Daughters of Bilitis served as a social alternative to bars for lesbians, but took great care to deny that they were "arranging for 'immoral contacts'." While president of the DOB in New York, attending members numbered between ten and forty per meeting. They met twice a month and often invited doctors, psychiatrists, ministers and attorneys to address their meetings, even if the message was clearly disparaging to lesbians. Gittings recalled, "At first we were so grateful just to have people — anybody — pay attention to us that we listened to and accepted everything they said, no matter how bad it was...anything that helped to break the silence, no matter how silly or foolish it may look to us today, was important."

Gittings admitted that early meetings and writings in the Daughters of Bilitis urged their members not to upset mainstream heterosexual society; that integration and acceptance would be won if heterosexuals could see that gays and lesbians were not dramatically different from themselves. She worked in clerical positions during this time, spending ten years as a mimeograph operator for an architectural firm. The New York chapter of the DOB distributed a newsletter to about 150 people, and Gittings worked on it while being required to stay overtime at her job. In 1959, after using company envelopes to mail the newsletter out and covering the firm's name with a sticker, someone wrote to the firm to notify them that a newsletter addressing lesbianism was being distributed. Gittings was sure that she would be fired, but her boss, a woman, stated cryptically that she was familiar with the topic, having served in the armed forces. She was not fired but cautioned to be more careful instead.

The Ladder
From 1963 to 1966, she edited the organization's magazine, The Ladder, following both Lyon and Martin as editors. Although the Daughters of Bilitis did take a political stand in the 1959 San Francisco mayoral race, Martin and Lyon preferred The Ladder to remain apolitical. Gittings was impressed with how her influence as editor impacted the magazine and the opinions of its readers. "I discovered the power of the press, the power to put in what you want in order to influence readers," she said.

At the 1963 convention of the newly formed East Coast Homophile Organizations, the audience heard a speaker named Dr. Albert Ellis tell them that "the exclusive homosexual" was a psychopath. Articles and essays in The Ladder sometimes carried these viewpoints, since it was difficult to get psychiatrists and doctors to address homosexuality in any form. Gittings said, "People like Ellis talked about homosexuality being a sickness. And they talked about a cure ... We'd sit there and listen and politely applaud and then go for the social hour afterward." However, after Dr. Ellis spoke, so did gay activist Frank Kameny, making an impression upon Gittings with his point that it is useless to try to find cures and causes for homosexuality since there is no valid evidence that it is an illness. Said Gittings, "My thinking didn't change until Frank Kameny came along and he said plainly and firmly and unequivocally that homosexuality is no kind of sickness or disease or disorder or malfunction, it is fully on par with heterosexuality ... Suddenly I found that I was looking at things that had happened in the past in a very different light and I was taking a position that was increasingly diverging from DOB's positions."

Gittings began to implement changes in The Ladder that included adding "A Lesbian Review" underneath the title on the cover and replacing the line drawings on the cover with photographs of actual lesbians, often taken by her partner, Kay Lahusen. Gittings distributed The Ladder in six bookstores in New York and Philadelphia, and one Greenwich Village store displayed the magazine prominently, selling 100 copies a month. The focus of the magazine shifted as well to tackling more controversial issues to spark debate, printing such articles titled "I Hate Women" remarking on women who are politically apathetic, and "To Act or to Teach?" that was a back-and-forth debate on whether it was more effective to educate the public or take political action.

Protests

Gittings participated in many of the earliest LGBT actions in the United States. In 1965, Gittings marched in the first gay picket lines at the White House, the US State Department, and at Independence Hall in Philadelphia to protest the federal government's policy on discrimination of homosexuals, holding a sign that read "Sexual preference is irrelevant to federal employment." The men who agreed to picket had to wear suits and ties, and the women who participated were to wear dresses, heels, and pantyhose so as to look employable by the federal government. Reactions from passersby were varied. A tourist witnessing the demonstration remarked, "I still don't believe it. Somebody's kidding." A stunned high school student pointed out, "They all look so normal."

Gittings recalled, "I remember a man said to his kids, 'Hold your noses — it's dirty here.' And there was a woman dragging a string of kids who said, very angrily, 'You should all be married and have children like me.'" Leaflets were distributed to passersby that described their reasons for picketing, surprising some recipients who were unaware gays and lesbians could be fired so easily, and disgusting others. Gittings remembered, "It was risky and we were scared. Picketing was not a popular tactic at the time. And our cause seemed outlandish even to most gay people."  The evening prior to the group's picketing the State Department, Secretary of State Dean Rusk announced the pickets at a press conference. Gittings connected the high-profile visibility with a "breakthrough into mainstream publicity."

From 1965 to 1969, she and Frank Kameny led the Annual Reminder, picketing at Independence Hall in Philadelphia on July 4, until the Stonewall Riots in June 1969. After the riots, the annual Gay Pride Parade commemorating the riots took its place.
Differences in Gittings' political stance and the leadership of the DOB began to show, and came to a culmination in 1966 when she was ousted as the editor of The Ladder for, as one source claims, creating the issue that reported on the DOB convention late, but according to another source because she removed "For Adults Only" on the cover of the magazine without consulting the DOB.

In November 1967, Gittings and Kameny worked together as co-counsel in hearings held by the Department of Defense to discredit an expert witness named Dr. Charles Socarides, who testified that homosexuals could be converted to heterosexuality, and to call in question the policy held by the Department of Defense that homosexual employees could be fired for being named as homosexuals. "Publicity was the objective", Gittings recalled many years later. Kameny and Gittings dressed conservatively, but wore buttons that said "Gay is Good" and "Pray for Sodomy." "We held press conferences for the benefit of sharp-eyed reporters. When we first went into a hearing room, we made certain to shake hands with all ... participants so (they) could not avoid reading our buttons. Although neither was an attorney, at the end of their cross-examination, the Department of Defense removed Socarides from their lists of expert witnesses.

Gittings made hundreds of appearances as a speaker in the late 1960s. She carried on her mission to convince heterosexuals and homosexuals alike that homosexuality is not an illness, stating in a letter in 1967:
I keep trying to convince people in the movement that the charge of sickness is perhaps our greatest problem ... we can't really progress in other directions until the unsubstantiated assumption of sickness...is demolished! It's almost always there, however slyly or covertly or even unconsciously, however 'sympathetic' the person: the attitude that homosexuality is somehow undesirable, some sort of twist or malfunction or failure or maladaptation or other kind of psychic sickness. And in our society sick people, by any definition of sick, just DO not get equal treatment. Equal treatment — no more, no less — is what we want! And compassion — which many homosexuals gladly swallow because they think it represents an improvement in attitudes toward them — is not equal treatment.

Activism in the 1970s and later

American Library Association
In the 1970s, Gittings continued her search for resources in libraries that addressed homosexuality in a positive, supportive way. In discussing her pursuit of the improvement of materials for gays and lesbians in libraries, she said, "For years I would haunt libraries and secondhand book shops trying to find stories to read about my people, and then I became active in other arenas of the gay rights movement, but I always kept an eye on the emerging literature...It began to talk about homosexuals who were healthy and happy and wholesome and who had good lives...That rang the bells for me—libraries, gay books!"

Gittings found a home in the gay group that formed in 1970 in the American Library Association, the first gay caucus in a professional association, and became its coordinator in 1971. She pushed the American Library Association for more visibility for gays and lesbians in the profession. She staffed a kissing booth at the national convention of the ALA in Dallas in 1971, underneath the banner "Hug a Homosexual," with a "women only" side and a "men only" side. When no one took advantage of it, she and Patience and Sarah author Alma Routsong (pen name: Isabel Miller) kissed in front of rolling television cameras. In describing its success, despite most of the reaction being negative, Gittings said, "We needed to get an audience. So we decided, let's show gay love live. We were offering free—mind you, free—same-sex kisses and hugs. Let me tell you, the aisles were mobbed, but no one came into the booth to get a free hug. So we hugged and kissed each other. It was shown twice on the evening news, once again in the morning. It put us on the map."

American Psychiatric Association

In 1972, Gittings and Kameny organized a discussion with the American Psychiatric Association entitled "Psychiatry: Friend or Foe to Homosexuals: A Dialogue", where a panel of psychiatrists were to discuss homosexuality. When Gittings' partner Kay Tobin Lahusen noticed that all the psychiatrists were heterosexual, she protested. Gittings remembered, "My partner, Kay, said, 'This isn't right—here you have two psychiatrists pitted against two gays, and what you really need is someone who is both.' The panel moderator, Dr. Kent Robinson, agreed to add a gay psychiatrist if we could find one. In 1972 who would come forward? ... Kay and I wrote letters and made phone calls around the country." A gay psychiatrist in Philadelphia finally agreed to appear on the panel in heavy disguise, and with a voice distorting microphone, calling himself "Dr. H. Anonymous". He was  John E. Fryer, and he discussed how he was forced to be closeted while practicing psychiatry. Gittings read aloud letters from psychiatrists she had solicited who declined to appear for fear of professional ostracism. She described the event as "transformative".

In 1973, homosexuality was removed from the Diagnostic and Statistical Manual as a mental disorder, and Gittings celebrated by being photographed with the Philadelphia newspaper headlines, "Twenty Million Homosexuals Gain Instant Cure."

Gittings spent 16 years working with libraries and campaigning to get positive gay and lesbian-themed materials into libraries and to eliminate censorship and job discrimination. She wrote Gays in Library Land: The Gay and Lesbian Task Force of the American Library Association: The First Sixteen Years., a brief history of the group. She helped start what was then called the National Gay Task Force, later to be named the National Gay and Lesbian Task Force (NGLTF) in 1973. Gittings served on the board of the NGLTF throughout the 1980s. She inspired nurses to form the Gay Nurses Alliance in 1973. She held exhibits at APA conventions in 1972, 1976, and 1978, her last one being "Gay Love: Good Medicine" that portrayed gays as happy and healthy.

Other
Gittings made an appearance on The Phil Donahue Show in 1970 and on PBS' David Susskind Show in 1971, along with six other lesbians, including Lilli Vincenz and Barbara Love. They were among the first open lesbians to appear on television in the US, and debated long-held stereotypes about gays with Susskind. This segment is remembered for Gittings saying, "Homosexuals today are taking it for granted that their homosexuality is not at all something dreadful – it's good, it's right, it's natural, it's moral, and this is the way they are going to be!".  A week after this appearance on the David Susskind Show, a middle-aged couple approached Gittings in the supermarket to claim, "You made me realize that you gay people love each other just the way Arnold and I do."

In 1991 Gittings remembered her decisions to be as open as she was throughout her life when she said, "Every time I had to make a decision to put myself forward or to stay back, to use my real name or not, to go on television or decline, to get out on some of the earliest picket lines or remain behind. I usually took the public position because there weren't many of us yet that could afford the risk."

Legacy

Gittings appeared in the documentary films Gay Pioneers, Before Stonewall, After Stonewall, Out of the Past, and Pride Divide.

In 1999, Gittings was honored for her contributions to the LGBT cause at the seventh annual PrideFest America, in Philadelphia. The organization described Gittings as "the Rosa Parks of the gay and lesbian civil rights movement".

In 2001, the Gay and Lesbian Alliance Against Defamation honored Gittings by bestowing on her the first Barbara Gittings Award, highlighting dedication to activism.

Also in 2001, the Free Library of Philadelphia announced its Barbara Gittings Collection of books dedicated to gay and lesbian issues. There are more than 2000 items in the collection, the second largest gay and lesbian collection of books in the US outside that of the San Francisco Public Library.

As recognition for Gittings' contributions to the promotion of gay and lesbian literature, in 2002 the Gay, Lesbian, Bisexual, and Transgender Round Table of the ALA renamed one of their three book awards the Stonewall Book Award-Barbara Gittings Literature Award.

In 2003, the American Library Association rewarded her with its highest tribute, lifetime honorary membership.

The Philadelphia "Progress" series of murals by Ann Northrup, located at 1315 Spruce Street, Center City, Philadelphia, features an image of Barbara Gittings in the "Pride and Progress" mural. In the painting you can see a man pasting up a poster that shows part of the Annual Reminder picket from 1966.

In 2006 Gittings and Frank Kameny received the first John E. Fryer, MD Award from the American Psychiatric Association. The award goes to people who have made a significant impact on the mental health of gays and lesbians.

In October 2006, the Smithsonian Institution acquired a sign she carried in her picketing in 1965, donated by Frank Kameny.

In 2007, readers of The Advocate included Gittings on a list of their 40 favorite gay and lesbian heroes.

Gittings and her partner Kay Tobin Lahusen donated copies of some materials and photographs covering their activism to the Cornell University Rare and Manuscript Collections. In 2007, Lahusen donated all of their original papers and photographs to the New York City Public Library (NYPL), whose head, Paul LeClerc, said, "The collection donated by Barbara Gittings and Kay Tobin Lahusen is a remarkable first-hand chronicle detailing the battles of gays and lesbians to overcome the prejudice and restrictions that were prevalent prior to the activism and protest movements that started in the 1960s."

The University of Massachusetts Amherst main library received a donation of over 1,000 of Gittings' and Lahusen's books in 2007; it is the Gittings-Lahusen Gay Book Collection, Call no.: RB 005.

On October 1, 2012, the city of Philadelphia named a section of Locust Street "Barbara Gittings Way" in Gittings' memory.

Also in 2012, she was inducted into the Legacy Walk, an outdoor public display which celebrates LGBT history and people.

In June 2019 Gittings was one of the inaugural fifty American "pioneers, trailblazers, and heroes" inducted on the National LGBTQ Wall of Honor within the Stonewall National Monument (SNM) in New York City's Stonewall Inn. The SNM is the first U.S. national monument dedicated to LGBTQ rights and history, and the wall's unveiling was timed to take place during the 50th anniversary of the Stonewall riots.

Season 1, episode 9 and Season 2, episode 8 of the podcast "Making Gay History" are about her and Lahusen.

Personal life
Gittings was an avid music lover, most interested in Baroque and Renaissance music. She sang in choral groups for most of her life, spending over 50 years in the Philadelphia Chamber Chorus. She was also a hiking and canoeing enthusiast. She and her lifelong partner, Kay Tobin (also known as Kay Tobin Lahusen; born 1930) met in 1961 at a picnic in Rhode Island. Gittings described how they began: "We hit it off, we started courting. I flew to Boston [to see her] and got off the plane with a big bunch of flowers in my hand. I couldn't resist. I did not care what the world thought. I dropped the flowers, grabbed her and kissed her. That was not being done in 1961." Gittings and Lahusen were together for 46 years.

In 1997, Gittings and Lahusen pushed the American Association of Retired Persons (AARP) to grant couple's membership to them, for a reduced price on health insurance. One of her last acts as an activist was to come out in the newsletter published by the assisted living facility they reside in. In 1999, Gittings summed up her inspiration for her activism: "As a teenager, I had to struggle alone to learn about myself and what it meant to be gay. Now for 48 years I've had the satisfaction of working with other gay people all across the country to get the bigots off our backs, to oil the closet door hinges, to change prejudiced hearts and minds, and to show that gay love is good for us and for the rest of the world too. It's hard work — but it's vital, and it's gratifying, and it's often fun!"

Death
On February 18, 2007, Gittings died in Kennett Square, Pennsylvania after a long battle with breast cancer. She was survived by her life partner, Kay Tobin Lahusen, and her sister, Eleanor Gittings Taylor. Gittings was interred in the historic Congressional Cemetery in Washington, D.C.

Bibliography
 Baim, Tracy.<3 (2015) Barbara Gittings: Gay Pioneer. CreateSpace Independent Publishing Platform; 
 Bullough, Vern, ed. (2002) Before Stonewall: Activists for gay and lesbian rights in historical context. Harrington Park Press; 
 Gallo, Marcia. (2006) Different Daughters: A History of the Daughters of Bilitis and the Rise of the Lesbian Rights Movement. Carrol & Graf Publishers; 
 Katz, Jonathan. (1976) Gay American History: Lesbians and Gay Men in the U.S.A. Crowell; 
 Marcus, Eric. (2002) Making Gay History: The half-century fight for lesbian and gay equal rights. Perennial Press; 
 Tobin, Kay and Wicker, Randy. (1975) The Gay Crusaders. Arno Press;

References

External links

 
 
 Barbara Gittings And Kay Tobin Lahusen Miscellany, 1965-1982, via Cornell University
 Special Collection #0003: The Barbara Gittings/Kay Tobin Lahusen Collection held by the John J. Wilcox, Jr. LGBT Archives, William Way LGBT Community Center
 Barbara Gittings and Kay Tobin Lahusen gay history papers and photographs, 1855-2009 (bulk 1963-2007), held by the Manuscripts and Archives Division, New York Public Library

1932 births
2007 deaths
American Library Association people
American magazine editors
Women magazine editors
Daughters of Bilitis members
Deaths from cancer in Pennsylvania
Deaths from breast cancer
Former Roman Catholics
American lesbian writers
LGBT people from Pennsylvania
American LGBT journalists
American LGBT rights activists
Northwestern University School of Communication alumni
Political activists from Pennsylvania
Activists from Philadelphia
American librarianship and human rights
Journalists from Pennsylvania
20th-century American journalists
20th-century American LGBT people
21st-century American LGBT people
20th-century American women writers
21st-century American women writers